Reima Valdemar Virtanen (born 5 November 1947 in Kemi, Finnish Lapland) is a former boxer from Finland, who won the silver medal in the middleweight division (– 75 kg) at the 1972 Summer Olympics in Munich. He was nicknamed "Kila" and "Rema" during his career. In the final Virtanen was knocked out in 2:17 of the first round by Vyacheslav Lemechev of the Soviet Union.

Olympic results 
1st round bye
Defeated Titus Simba (Tanzania) 3-2
Defeated Witold Stachurski (Poland) TKO 3
Defeated Prince Amartey (Ghana) 3-2
Lost to Vyacheslav Lemeshev (Soviet Union) KO by 1

References
 sports-reference

1947 births
Living people
People from Kemi
Middleweight boxers
Boxers at the 1972 Summer Olympics
Olympic boxers of Finland
Olympic silver medalists for Finland
Olympic medalists in boxing
Finnish male boxers
Medalists at the 1972 Summer Olympics
Sportspeople from Lapland (Finland)